Stacy D. VanDeveer (born 1967) is an American academic and international relations scholar. He is Professor, Department of Conflict Resolution, Human Security, and Global Governance at the McCormack Graduate School at the University of Massachusetts, Boston. He was Chair of the Department of Political Science and Professor of Political Science at the University of New Hampshire. He has also taught courses with Harvard Extension School and Harvard Summer School, and been a fellow at Harvard University's John F. Kennedy School of Government, Brown University's Transatlantic Academy, UMASS, and UNH London Program. VanDeveer has authored and co-authored over 90 articles, book chapters, reports and six co-edited books on his specialties. His research interests include international relations, comparative politics, LGBT rights, EU and transatlantic politics, humanitarian degradation and connections between environmental and security issues.

Early life 

VanDeveer was born in 1967 in Chillicothe, Illinois and attended Il Valley Central High School. He earned a BA in Political Science/International Relations and Western Literature from the University of Illinois at Urbana-Champaign (1985-1990), a MA from the University of Maryland (1994) and a PhD in Political Science/International Relations from the same university (1990-1997). Later at Harvard, he became a post-doctoral research fellow in the Belfer Center for Science and International Affair's at the John F. Kennedy School of Government.

He is married (since 2012) and currently resides in Boston, Massachusetts.

Career 

VanDeveer taught as an associate professor at the University of New Hampshire (2004 -2013) and as a professor and Department Chair at the same institution (2013–present) and has taught courses with Harvard Extension School and Harvard Summer School. He has also been a fellow at Harvard University's John F. Kennedy School of Government, Brown University's Transatlantic Academy, UMASS, and UNH London Program.

He has received research funding from the European Union, US National Science Foundation, the US Embassy of Canada, the Swedish Foundation for Strategic Environmental Research (MISTRA), among other entities. He has also briefed at the White House, Woodrow Wilson Center's Environmental Change and Security Program, among others.

Books 

 VanDeveer, Stacy D.; Brooks, L. Anathea (1997), Saving the Seas: Values, Scientists and International Governance, Cornell Maritim Pr/Tidewater Pub, 
 VanDeveer, Stacy D.; Schreurs, Miranda A.; Selin, Henrick (2009), Transatlantic environment and Energy Politics (Global Governance), Ashgate, ISBN 978- 0754675976
 VanDeveer, Stacy D.; Carmin, Joann (2004) EU Enlargement and the Environment: Institutional Changes and Environmental Policy in Central and Eastern Europe, Frank Cass & Co 
 VanDeveer, Stacy D. (2013) Still Digging: Extractive Industries, Resource Curses, and Transnational Governance in the Anthropocene, German Marshall Fund, ASIN B00B1H2HUC
 VanDeveer, Stacy D.; Selin, Henrik (2009) Changing Climates in North American Politics: Institutions, Policymaking, and Multilevel Governance, The MIT Press, 
 VanDeveer, Stacy D.; Kemp, Geoffrey; Johnson, Corey; Andrews-Speed, Philip; Boersma, Tim; Bleischwitz, Raimund (2012) The Global Resource Nexus: The Struggles for Land, Energy, Food, Water and Minerals, Transatlantic Academy, ASIN B0083H7O4M
 VanDeveer, Stacy D.; Axelrod, Regina S.; Downie, David Leonard The Global Environment: Institutions, Law, and Policy (Choice Outstanding Academic Books) CQ Press, 
 VanDeveer, Stacy D.; Bulkeley, Harriet; Andonova, Liliana; Betsill, Michele M.; Compagnon, Daiel; Hale, Thomas; Hoffmann, Matthew J.; Newell, Peter; Paterson, Matthew; Roger, Charles (2014) Transnational Climate Change Governance, Cambridge University Press, 
 VanDeveer, Stac D.; Bleischwitz, Raimund; Boersma, Tim; Johnson, Corey (2014) Want, Waste or War?: The Global Reousrce Nexus and the Struggle for Land, Energy, Food, Water and Minerals Routledge, 
 VanDeveer, Stacy D.; Selin, Henrik (2015) European Union and Environmental Governance (Global Institutions) Routledge, ASIN B00WZIDFDO
 VanDeveer, Stacy D.; Steinberg, Paul F. (2012) Comparative Environmental Politics: Theory, Practice, and Prospects (American and Comparative Environmental Policy) The MIT Press, ASIN B0078XFX9A
 VanDeveer, Stacy D.; Axelrod, Regina S. (2014) The Global Environment: Institutions, Law and Policy CQ Press,

References

1967 births
Living people
American political scientists
University of New Hampshire faculty
Harvard Kennedy School alumni
University of Maryland, College Park alumni
University of Illinois Urbana-Champaign alumni
People from Chillicothe, Illinois
Harvard Extension School faculty